Harlem Opera House was a US opera house located at 211 West 125th Street, in the Harlem neighborhood of Manhattan in New York City. Designed by architect John B. McElfatrick, it was built in 1889 by Oscar Hammerstein; it was his first theater in the city.

History 
An early work at the house was The Charlatan, an operetta with music and lyrics by John Philip Sousa and a book by Charles Klein, which transferred from the Knickerbocker Theatre. From 1900 to 1911, the theater was known as Keith & Proctor’s Harlem Opera House. Through the early 1920s, the venue was included in the Keith-Albee vaudeville circuit. By 1922, it was purchased by Frank Schiffman and subsequently closed. The Harlem Opera House showed films starting in the mid-1930s. It was demolished in December 1959.

Architecture and fittings
The venue featured a wide and a grand staircase and balcony of polished Italian marble. The auditorium offered blue seats, and the boxes were arranged in three tiers on either side of the stage. They occupied the most conspicuous part of the theatre, were set forward, and were entirely open. The curtain was made by E. T. Harvey and was decorated with an image of Shakespeare reading one of his plays to Queen Elizabeth and some members of her court; it was painted in bright colors.

References

Bibliography

External links
 Harlem Opera House at the Internet Broadway Database

Harlem
Opera houses in New York City
Opera in New York City
Commercial buildings completed in 1889
1959 disestablishments in New York (state)
Former theatres in Manhattan
Demolished buildings and structures in Manhattan
Buildings and structures demolished in 1959